The Royal Palace of Amsterdam in Amsterdam (Dutch: Koninklijk Paleis van Amsterdam or ) is one of three palaces in the Netherlands which are at the disposal of the monarch by Act of Parliament. It is situated on the west side of Dam Square in the centre of Amsterdam, opposite the War Memorial and next to the Nieuwe Kerk.

The palace was built as a city hall during the Dutch Golden Age in the 17th century. The building became the royal palace of King Louis Napoleon and later of the Dutch Royal House.

History

Town hall
The structure was built as the Town Hall of the City of Amsterdam "facing the landing wharfs along Damrak, which at that time would have been busy with ships". The town hall was opened on 29 July 1655 by Cornelis de Graeff, the mayor of Amsterdam. The main architect was Jacob van Campen, who took control of the construction project in 1648. It was built on 13,659 wooden piles.

Palace

After the patriot revolution which swept the House of Orange from power a decade earlier, the new Batavian Republic was forced to accept Louis Napoleon, brother of Napoleon Bonaparte, as King Louis I of Holland in 1806. After holding his court at The Hague and Utrecht, Louis Napoleon moved to Amsterdam, and converted the Town Hall into a royal palace for himself.

The King of Holland did not have long to appreciate his new palace. He abdicated on 2 July 1810.

It was made property of the Kingdom of the Netherlands in 1936.

The palace is used by the monarch for entertaining and official functions during state visits and other official receptions, such as New Year receptions. The award ceremonies of the Erasmus Prize, of the Silver Carnation, of the Royal Awards for Painting, and of the Prince Claus Award are also held in the palace.

The balcony of the Royal Palace was used during the investiture of Queen Beatrix in 1980, where her mother Juliana announced the new queen to the people.

The palace was renovated from 2005 until June 2009, during which, among other things, asbestos was removed. Since 14 June 2009, the palace is open again to visitors.

Notable features
The sandstone of yellowish hue has darkened considerably in the course of time. Astride the rear of the building is a 6-metre-tall statue of Atlas carrying the Globe on his shoulders.

Gallery

References

External links
 
Virtual tour of the Royal Palace of Amsterdam provided by Google Arts & Culture

Dam Square
Baroque palaces in the Netherlands
Buildings of the Dutch Golden Age
Domes
Museums in Amsterdam
Historic house museums in the Netherlands
Houses completed in 1665
Marble buildings
Palaces in the Netherlands
Rijksmonuments in Amsterdam
Royal residences in the Netherlands
1665 establishments in the Dutch Republic